(born September 14, 1982), better known as , is a former Japanese actor.

Early life
He was born and raised in Tokyo, Japan. His parents are from Okinawa Prefecture. His parents divorced when he was young, and in his third year of junior high school, his mother died and he raised his brother by dropping out of school, taking on part-time jobs, and paid for his brother's high school and college expenses. He had made a promise to his mother to become serious about acting and through his multitude of part-time jobs, was eventually scouted and passed an audition making his way into his debut in 2000.

Career
He soon debuted in 2000 in the play "Horobikaketa Jinrui, Sono Ai no Honshitsu to wa (Perishing Humankind, What is the Essence of Its Love?)." Hiroki was chosen for the part of Kane out of the 3000 actors who auditioned.

In February 2001, he made his movie debut in "Oboreru Sakana", a Toei production. In 2002, he appeared as Noda in the television drama, "Gokusen." With his life-sized performance in this role, Hiroki won both serious acclaim and popularity. That same year, he was the lead in "Okan wa Uchu wo Shihaisuru", a television special on Fuji Television Network. Come 2003, he performed in his first period film, Azumi, which became a box office hit and allowed Hiroki to display his swordplay skills from daily training.

In 2004, Hiroki returned to the stage in the Shakespearean play "Oki ni Mesumama (As You Like It)" and had a supporting role in the TBS drama Orange Days. The next year, he starred in the TBS series "Ima, Ai ni Yukimasu" and was featured in four films, including Nana, the sequel for which was released December 2006. In 2012, Hiroki starred as Phoenix Wright in the live-action film adaption Ace Attorney directed by Takashi Miike.

While working on his acting career, Hiroki has been proving himself quite the fashion leader. He designed a line of clothes along with many collaboration projects. Fall 2003, he appeared as a model for his Tokyo collection. His trademark hairstyle (the "Narimiya Cut") became all the rage among Japanese teens. Hiroki has also appeared on more than 10 covers of fashion and other magazines in the past year and received the 2005 Crystallized Style Award (presented by Swarovski).

Hiroki has received many offers to model overseas for high-fashion brands, which fits in his plans to pursue work outside Japan as both a model and actor.

On December 9, 2016, Narimiya sent a fax to TV news channels announcing that he was leaving the entertainment industry due to allegations he used cocaine.

Filmography

Movies

Oboreru Sakana (2001)
Ikisudama (2001)
Ainokarada (2003)
Shinkokyu (2004)
Tantei Jimusho 5  (2005)
Drop (2009)
Lalapipo (2009)
Bakamono (2010)

Dramas

Kindaichi Case Files (2001) - episode 4 & 5
Toshiie to Matsu (2002)                                                                                                        
Sarariman Kintaro 3                                                                                                              
Kisarazu Cat's Eye (2003)                                                                                                      
Gokusen (2003)                                                                                                                 
Kou Kou Kyoushi 2003                                                                                                             
Stand UP!! (2003)                                                                                                   
Trick 3 (2003)                                                                                                                 
Orange Days (2004)                                                                                                                
M no Higeki (2005)                                                                                                                
Ima, Ai ni Yukimasu (2005)                                                                                                     
Ai no Uta (2005)                                                                                         
Onna no Ichidaiki (2005)                                                                                                       
Koumyou ga Tsuji (2006)                                                                                                        
Barefoot Gen (2007)     
The Family (2007)                                                        
Honey and Clover (2008)                                                                                                    
Innocent Love (TV series) (2008)                                                                      
Bloody Monday (2008)                                                                                     
Tokyo Dogs (2009) - episode 1     
Sweet Room (2009)  
Bloody Monday Season 2 (2010)     
Yankee-kun to Megane-chan (2010)                                                                                               
Juui Dolittle (2010)                                                                                                           
Saigo no Bansan (2011)                                                                                                         
Hi wa Mata Noboru (2011)
Kaze no Shounen (2011) as Yutaka Ozaki                                                                                               
Mou Yuukai Nante Shinai (2012)
Ikyu san (2012)
Aibou season 11 (2012)
Ikyu san 2 (2013)
Kuroyuri-danchi~JyoJyou~ (2013) - episode 7
Aibou season 12 (2013)
Kindaichi Case Files - 獄門塾殺人事件 (2014)
37.5℃ no Namida (2015) - Motoharu Asahina

Stage
 (2003)
 (2004)
 (2004)
Madame Melville (2004)
Kitchen (2005)

Video games

Dubbing roles

Advertisements
 J-PHONE（2002）
 House Food ビストロシェフ
 「ビストロシェフ」（2003）
 House Food 新・カレーライス宣言  (2005)
 アニマックス 開局5周年記念CM（2003）
 JAL 北海道キャンペーン（2004）
 Vodafone（2004）
 SEA BREEZE（2006）
 UNIQLO（2007）
 宝酒造「TAKARA CAN CHU-HI」（2007）
 GUNZE（2008）
 森永乳業「MORINAGAMILK DOUBLE ESPRESSO」（2009）
 キャドバリー「STRIDE」（2010）
 シマンテック「NORTON 2011」（2010）
 コスモライフ「COSMO WATER」（2012）
 YAMATO HOME CONVENIENCE（2012）
 Sapporo Brewery「WHITE BELG」（2014）

References

External links
TOPCOAT Talent Agency
Narifamily

1982 births
Living people
Japanese male film actors
Japanese male television actors
Japanese male video game actors
Japanese male voice actors
Male voice actors from Tokyo
Male actors from Tokyo
20th-century Japanese male actors
21st-century Japanese male actors